Fast Company is a 1929 American Pre-Code sports comedy film directed by A. Edward Sutherland and starring Jack Oakie and Evelyn Brent. It is based upon the play Elmer the Great by George M. Cohan and Ring Lardner. According to the Internet Movie Database, the UCLA Film and Television Archive has reels 1, 2, and 3 of this film, with reel 4 having disintegrated in 1990.

Plot
Egomaniacal baseball slugger Elmer Kane is not only good, he enjoys telling everybody how good he is. A professional scout, Bert Wade, takes an interest in Elmer, who in turn takes an interest in Evelyn Corey, an attractive actress.

Wade cons the ballplayer into thinking the actress is falling for him, which inspires a home run from Elmer to win the big game.

Cast
 Evelyn Brent as Evelyn Corey
 Jack Oakie as Elmer Kane
 Richard 'Skeets' Gallagher as Bert Wade
 Sam Hardy as Dave Walker
 Arthur Housman as Barney Barlow
 Gwen Lee as Rosie La Clerq
 Chester Conklin as C. of C. President
 E. H. Calvert as Platt
 Eugenie Besserer as Mrs. Kane
 Bert Rome as Hank Gordon

See also
 List of partially lost films

References

External links
 
 
 
 

1929 films
1929 comedy films
1920s sports comedy films
American baseball films
American sports comedy films
American black-and-white films
Films directed by A. Edward Sutherland
Films with screenplays by Florence Ryerson
Films with screenplays by Joseph L. Mankiewicz
1920s English-language films
1920s American films